Matti Samuel Laakso (23 March 1939 – 3 November 2020) was a Finnish wrestler, who competed in the 1960 Summer Olympics, in the 1964 Summer Olympics, and in the 1972 Summer Olympics. He was born and died in Ilmajoki, and was the elder brother of Finnish wrestler, Martti Laakso.

References

External links
 

1939 births
2020 deaths
Olympic wrestlers of Finland
Wrestlers at the 1960 Summer Olympics
Wrestlers at the 1964 Summer Olympics
Wrestlers at the 1972 Summer Olympics
Finnish male sport wrestlers